La Nau (literally "The Nave") is the former building of the old Universidad Literaria in Valencia, and is today one of the smaller buildings of the modern Universitat de València. The street itself is known as the carrer de la Nau after the building. It was built in 1497 and remodeled in 1830. The courtyard is now used for a café and exhibitions.

References

University of Valencia
Buildings and structures in Valencia
1497 establishments in Spain
Buildings and structures completed in 1497